Coazzolo is a comune (municipality) in the Province of Asti in the Italian region Piedmont, located about  southeast of Turin and about  south of Asti.

Coazzolo borders the following municipalities: Castagnole delle Lanze, Castiglione Tinella, Mango, Neive, and Santo Stefano Belbo.

Demographic evolution

References

Cities and towns in Piedmont